Grabow is a town in the Ludwigslust-Parchim district, in Mecklenburg-Western Pomerania, Germany. It is situated on the river Elde, 7 km (4.35 mi) southeast of Ludwigslust, and 34 km (21.12 mi) northwest of Wittenberge. It is twinned with Whitstable, in Kent.

History
The name Grabow is of Slavic Polabian origin, grab means "hornbeam". Names with this root occur often in Mecklenburg. It was only slightly changed as Grabowe (1186, 1252, 1275) and Grabow (1189, 1298). Pope Urban III. mentions castle Grabow for the first time in a letter from February 23, 1186. The city received city law in 1252 from the Count of Dannenberg. On 3 June 1725 the city was destroyed by a great fire. The palace was never rebuilt. At least since the 18th century there were Jews in the city, who left behind a synagogue and a cemetery. Both of them were damaged during the Kristallnacht. The Jews were murdered during the Nazi occupation of the town that began in 1939.  Most were sent to nearby Chelmno and gassed there.

The historical center of Grabow is distinguished by its close core of timber-framed houses of the 18th century.

From 1815 to 1918, Grabow was part of the Grand Duchy of Mecklenburg-Schwerin. On 1 January 2016, the former municipality Steesow became part of Grabow.

The painter Wilhelm Langschmidt was born in Grabow. He settled in the Elgin valley in South Africa. The town which grew around his trading store there still bears the name Grabouw, after his hometown.

Number of inhabitants
 1877: 4,200
 1910: 5,500
 1939: 5,900
 1946: 8,900
 1970: 8,500
 1984: 8,600
 1990: 8,098
 1995: 7,240
 1997: 6,934
 2000: 6,741
 2005: 6,231

Pictures

Notable people

 Frederick, Duke of Mecklenburg-Grabow also  Friedrich zu Grabow  (1638–1688), Duke's Grave in the crypt of the castle at Grabow.
 Karl Leopold, Duke of Mecklenburg-Schwerin (1678–1747), duke at the time of the Grabower Brandes of 1725
 Karl Leopold, Duke of Mecklenburg-Schwerin (1678–1747), reigning duke in Mecklenburg-Schwerin
 Christian Ludwig II, Duke of Mecklenburg-Schwerin (1683–1756), reigning duke in Mecklenburg-Schwerin
 Sophia Louise of Mecklenburg-Schwerin (1685–1735), Queen of Prussia
 Duke Louis of Mecklenburg-Schwerin (1725–1778), Hereditary Prince of Mecklenburg-Schwerin
 Marco Küntzel (born 1976), footballer, played from 1981 to 1990 at Empor Grabow
 Wilhelm Langschmidt (1805–1866), German-South African painter
  (1909–1987), politician (FDP)
 Frederick, Duke of Mecklenburg-Grabow (1638-1688), resided from 1669 until his death in Grabow
 The Mann family, a Hanseatic family
  (born 1936), architect
 Bastian Reinhardt (born 1975), footballer, played at Empor Grabow / Grabower FC, now sports director of Hamburger SV

References

External links

 Official website (German)

Cities and towns in Mecklenburg
Ludwigslust-Parchim
Populated places established in the 13th century
1250s establishments in the Holy Roman Empire
1252 establishments in Europe
Grand Duchy of Mecklenburg-Schwerin
Holocaust locations in Germany